Curtis Mansion is a historic home located at Newark in New Castle County, Delaware.  It was built in 1903 and is a  story, rectangular stone residence in the Richardsonian Romanesque style.  It has a five-bay facade, cross-gable roof, and northeast corner tower.  The house features a wrap-around porch with Doric order column posts.  It was built by Alfred A. Curtis, one of the three sons of F. D. Curtis, owner and operator of the Curtis Paper Mill.  The house was purchased by the University of Delaware and initially served as a dormitory for French students. It was subsequently acquired in 1992 by the English Language Institute of the University of Delaware.

It was added to the National Register of Historic Places in 1982.

References

University of Delaware
Houses on the National Register of Historic Places in Delaware
Richardsonian Romanesque architecture in Delaware
Houses completed in 1903
Houses in Newark, Delaware
National Register of Historic Places in New Castle County, Delaware